David Rodger Mitchell (March 26, 1898 – January 4, 1967) was a Canadian politician, who represented the riding of Sudbury in the House of Commons of Canada from 1953 until his death in 1967. He was a member of the Liberal Party.

Before entering politics, Mitchell was born in Owen Sound, Ontario. He was a pharmacist in Sudbury. He married Greta Beryl McElroy and had 3 children: daughter Jean Ann, son Jimmie, and daughter Ruth (Duggan).

The by-election following Mitchell's death of pulmonary fibrosis was held on May 29. Jim Jerome ran as the new Liberal candidate, but lost to New Democrat Bud Germa. However, Germa served the riding for just barely more than a year—in the national election the following year, Jerome defeated Germa.

References

1898 births
1967 deaths
Members of the House of Commons of Canada from Ontario
Liberal Party of Canada MPs
People from Owen Sound
Politicians from Greater Sudbury
Canadian pharmacists
Deaths from pulmonary fibrosis